National Route 82 is a national highway in South Korea connects Pyeongtaek to Hwaseong. It established on 1 July 1996.

Main stopovers
Gyeonggi Province
 Pyeongtaek - Hwaseong

Major intersections

 (■): Motorway
IS: Intersection, IC: Interchange

Gyeonggi Province

References

82
Roads in Gyeonggi